Kül Bilge Qadir Khan or Bilge Kul Qara Khan was the first known ruler of the Karakhanids.

Tribal affinity 
There are different theories on the tribal identity of Bilge Kul khagan. According to Western and Kazakh historiographies, he was a ruler of Isfijab, a descendant of the Karluk yabghu. Alternatively, he was from the Edgish tribe, a part of the Chigils or a Yagma. According to Pritsak, he claimed the title "Khaqan" after the fall of Uyghur khaganate since he was from the Ashina dynasty. However, Wei Liangtao claims that he was, in fact, Pang Tegin, a ruler of remnants of the Uyghur ruling dynasty in Khotan. Qian Baiquan doubted that.

References 

Turkic rulers
Founding monarchs